George Alfred Winterling (born September 1, 1931) is a retired television weatherman.  He was the creator of the "heat index".  Chief Meteorologist for television station WJXT in Jacksonville, Florida for almost fifty years, Winterling helped develop modern forecasting.

Education
Winterling was born in New Jersey, but moved with his family to Jacksonville at age 10. He graduated from Robert E. Lee High School in 1949 and joined the United States Air Force. After discovering that cadet training required two years of college, he chose meteorology and was sent to Weather Observers School at Chanute Air Force Base in Rantoul, Illinois. He was stationed for a year at Turner Air Force Base in Albany, Georgia, then attended Intermediate Meteorology School at Oklahoma A&M in Stillwater. He was posted to Shemya Air Force Base in the Aleutian Islands of Alaska where he observed the Pacific Ocean's killer storms.

After leaving the service in 1954, he attended Jacksonville Junior College (now Jacksonville University), transferred to Florida State University and earned a meteorology degree in 1957. He was initially employed by the United States Weather Bureau (now known as the National Weather Service) and stayed there for five years.

Hurricane Donna was a major 1960 hurricane which made landfall at Marathon, moved into the Gulf of Mexico, came ashore north of Naples, crossed the state and returned to the Atlantic Ocean at Daytona Beach before skirting the east coast all the way to Canada. Over 17 days, the storm was responsible for over 350 deaths and $900 million in damages. The hurricane piqued Winterling's interest. It convinced him that "the media needed knowledgeable persons doing weathercasts in times of emergencies" such as hurricanes.

Broadcasting
In 1962, Winterling approached WJXT management with a new idea: add a meteorologist to the news broadcast to present a weather forecast. The idea was accepted and he was hired for the job. Less than two years later, Winterling was the only local forecaster to warn Jacksonville residents that Hurricane Dora would make landfall on the First Coast.

Winterling has been a member of the American Meteorological Society (AMS) since 1963 and his broadcasts carried their Seal of Approval.

In the early days before satellite pictures, he created and copyrighted the space-view maps to portray weather systems across the country, and began the practice of predicting rainfall probability. In 1969, Winterling was appointed to the Board of Radio and Television Weathercasting and redesigned the AMS Seal of Approval during 1973. He was employed by Jacksonville University as an adjunct professor beginning in 1975, teaching meteorology through 1994. 
To account for the combination of summer heat and humidity, he created the "humiture" calculation in 1978, which the National Weather Service adopted as heat index the following year.

Winterling received an outstanding service award from the AMS in 1984 for his use of animation to enable viewers to better understand weather phenomenon. He became a Certified Consulting Meteorologist after passing the AMS exam in 1989.

Semi-retirement
Beginning in March 2009, the station began promoting "The Big Secret". On April 23, 2009, WJXT's general manager, Bob Ellis, revealed that Winterling was going into semi-retirement.  While he would no longer appear on the daily newscasts, he would fill in when the station's other weatherpeople were on vacation and also serve as a severe weather expert during hurricanes. Winterling stated that he would have more time for community events and appearances at schools and civic organizations, which he claimed to enjoy. He noted that in the early years, there were occasions when he needed to alert viewers to severe weather conditions, but the network's broadcast rules did not permit the interruption of programs. Television weather forecasting had advanced immeasurably from when his only tools were a rain gauge, thermometer, anemometer and wind vane. Today, computers and satellites are the primary tools. Ellis commented:
“George Winterling is as famous as it gets. He pioneered the way we do weather, he helped us understand how we can make it relevant to viewers. He was the first to invent satellite maps. He painted clouds on them. He was the first in television to predict rainfall. He created the humidity/temperature thing we call the humiture or how hot the humidity combined with the temperature makes the air feel. The National Weather Service today calls it the heat index.”

May 20, 2009 was Winterling's last appearance as weather anchor on the 6:00 news show.

On June 23, 2009, the Jacksonville City Council passed Resolution 2009-396-A "RECOGNIZING AND COMMENDING GEORGE WINTERLING FOR HIS FORTY-SEVEN YEARS OF DEDICATED PUBLIC SERVICE AS CHIEF METEOROLOGIST AT WJXT" and honored him with a standing ovation.
WHEREAS, George Winterling, originally from New Jersey, came to Jacksonville at the age of ten,  and he attended local schools before joining the United States Air Force, where he received training in the field of meteorology, the field destined to become his lifelong passion; and

WHEREAS, upon discharge from the United States Air Force, Mr. Winterling continued his academic studies at Jacksonville Junior College, now known as Jacksonville University, and then at Florida State University, where he received his degree in meteorology prior to beginning his career as a meteorologist with what is today called the National Weather Service; and

WHEREAS, Mr. Winterling approached WJXT, local Channel 4, in 1962 with what was at that time a novel idea of having a meteorologist deliver the weather forecasts, and he soon gained fame as the only local weathercaster to accurately predict Hurricane Dora coming ashore near Jacksonville in 1964; and

WHEREAS, George Winterling’s long and storied career involving weather, environmental experiences, and gardening tips is punctuated with untold innovations and firsts, as well as numerous national honors and awards, including achievement of Certified Consulting Meteorologist status with the American Meteorological Society, and he is well-known and respected for his timely and accurate forecasting skills while under pressure from imminent danger to the community, but he will always be remembered as a beloved and trusted friend for his unique ability to make complex meteorological concepts simple, understandable, personal, and particularly enjoyable to the average television viewer; and

WHEREAS, in addition to being a household name due to his television duties, George Winterling has welcomed and enjoyed innumerable opportunities to meet with tens of thousands of area residents through public appearances and school visits, and his faithful dedication to serving, informing, and protecting the citizens of the greater Jacksonville area has made him worthy of both emulation and honor; now, therefore

BE IT RESOLVED by the Council of the City of Jacksonville:

Section 1. The City Council does hereby recognize and commend George Winterling for his forty-seven years of dedicated public service as chief meteorologist at WJXT.

Section 2. The City Council does further thank Mr. Winterling for his unfailing commitment to keeping the residents of the greater Jacksonville community apprised of the latest weather-related news and developments, wishing for him much personal success and happiness in his new role at WJXT as severe weather and hurricane expert, and in all his future endeavors.

Section 3. This resolution shall become effective upon signature by the Mayor or upon becoming effective without the Mayor's signature.

He returned to WJXT to broadcast the weather shortly after recovering from Cardiac Arrest for one broadcast during their morning show on November 21, 2011.

Garden
Winterling was also known for his gardening skills. His interest in gardening began with his mother's victory garden during World War II.
He maintained a garden at his home, and shared pictures and produce with other employees. WJXT's station manager suggested that he begin a garden at the station in 1991 and they created a weekly segment called George's Garden, which offered advice on when to plant, what to grow, watering and fertilization. For nearly 12 years, Winterling delivered the 6:00 weather live from the garden each Thursday during the growing season. Eventually, George began taping the show early to avoid bad weather and changing clothes between broadcasts. Even after his retirement, Winterling assured his fans, “I’ll still be around. I can’t get away from the garden.”

Family
George and his wife Virginia were married in 1956 and have 3 children (Wendy Gale, Frank, & Steve) and several grandchildren. For their golden wedding anniversary, they traveled to Alaska to revisit the base where George was stationed in 1953. They reside in the Mandarin area of Jacksonville.

References

External links
George Winterling biography
George's Garden webpage
George Winterling Hurricane Blog

American television journalists
Television anchors from Jacksonville, Florida
1931 births
Living people
People from Jacksonville, Florida
People from Pine Beach, New Jersey
Florida State University alumni
Jacksonville University alumni
American male journalists